The Cycad Nature Reserve is a small reserve near Bathurst for the purpose of conserving the critically endangered cycad Encephalartos latifrons. Near the reserve is the Waters Meeting Nature Reserve and Buffalo Kloof Protected Environment. Part of the Kariega River runs down the western and southern part of the reserve.

History 
In 1976, 43.60 ha of land was proclaimed for the conservation of the endangered Encephalartos latifrons.

See also 

 List of protected areas of South Africa

References 

Nature reserves in South Africa
Eastern Cape Provincial Parks